Deborah ( Deborah) appears in the Hebrew Bible as the nurse of Rebecca (Genesis 35:8). She is first mentioned by name in the Torah when she dies in a place called Alon Bachot (אלון בכות), "Tree of Weepings" (Genesis 35:8), and is buried by Jacob, who is returning with his large family to Canaan. 

According to Rashi, Deborah was sent by Laban to care for his sister Rebecca when the latter went to marry Isaac (Genesis 24:59). After Rebecca's son Jacob had been away from home for 22 years, Rebecca dispatched her loyal nurse to tell Jacob that it was safe for him to return home. The elderly nurse delivered her message and died on the return journey.

External links
 
 

Book of Genesis people
Women in the Hebrew Bible
Cultural depictions of nurses